is a Japanese diplomat who is currently serving as Ambassador of Japan in the Kingdom of Bahrain, having held that post since October 2014. Previously he worked as the deputy chief of mission in Bahrain, and later was the Japanese consul general in Mumbai, India, as well as also having served in several other Arab nations.

References

Ambassadors of Japan to Bahrain
Living people
Year of birth missing (living people)